Münzberg is a German surname, derived from Münze (coin) and Berg (mountain). Notable people with the surname include:

  (1902–1994), German lawyer and composer
 Hans-Georg Münzberg (1916–2000), German engineer and academic teacher
 Johann Münzberg (1799–1878), Bohemian textile manufacturer and entrepreneur
  (born 1938), German writer and critic
  (born 1928), German lawyer and academic teacher

German-language surnames